Carcajou is an unincorporated community located in the town of Sumner, Jefferson County, Wisconsin, United States.

The word carcajou is Canadian French for "wolverine".

Notes

Unincorporated communities in Jefferson County, Wisconsin
Unincorporated communities in Wisconsin